Ornipholidotos maesseni is a butterfly in the family Lycaenidae. It is found in Ghana and Nigeria. The habitat consists of forests.

References

Butterflies described in 2005
Taxa named by Michel Libert
Ornipholidotos